The Sligo Senior Football League Division 2 is an annual Gaelic Athletic Association club league competition between the Sligo clubs operating in the Senior League, though not in the top division. This split has been in place since 2004, when the Division was known as Division 1B. The finalists are both promoted to Division 1 for the following year. Geevagh won the title in 2008, defeating Castleconnor in the final.

Top winners

Roll of honour
From 2010 there were no league finals played. The team who finished top of the table was deemed the winner. Since 2015 a league final has been played.

References
Sligo GAA 125 History (2010)

External links
Official Sligo Website
Sligo on Hoganstand
Sligo Club GAA

2